Reginald Gerard McGrew (born December 16, 1976) is an American former college and professional football player who was a defensive tackle in the National Football League (NFL) for four seasons during the late 1990s and early 2000s.  McGrew played college football for the University of Florida, and thereafter, he played professionally for the San Francisco 49ers and the Atlanta Falcons of the NFL.

Early years 

McGrew was born in Mayo, Florida.  He attended Lafayette High School in Mayo, and played high school football for the Lafayette Hornets.

College career 

McGrew accepted an athletic scholarship to attend the University of Florida in Gainesville, Florida, where he played for coach Steve Spurrier's Florida Gators football team from 1996 to 1998.  The Gators coaching staff decided to redshirt him in 1995, and he subsequently became a starter on the Gators defensive line and was a member of the 1996 Gators team that defeated the Florida State Seminoles 52–20 in the Sugar Bowl to win the Bowl Alliance national championship.  He received first-team All-Southeastern Conference (SEC) honors following his junior season in 1998, and he decided to forgo his final season of NCAA eligibility and entered the NFL Draft.

After McGrew's NFL career was over, he returned to Gainesville to complete his bachelor's degree in sociology in 2010.

Professional career 

He appeared in no games as a rookie, but played in twenty-four NFL games over the following three seasons.

See also 

 Florida Gators
 Florida Gators football, 1990–99
 List of Florida Gators in the NFL Draft
 List of San Francisco 49ers first-round draft picks
 List of University of Florida alumni

References

Bibliography 

 Carlson, Norm, University of Florida Football Vault: The History of the Florida Gators, Whitman Publishing, LLC, Atlanta, Georgia (2007).  .
 Golenbock, Peter, Go Gators!  An Oral History of Florida's Pursuit of Gridiron Glory, Legends Publishing, LLC, St. Petersburg, Florida (2002).  .
 Hairston, Jack, Tales from the Gator Swamp: A Collection of the Greatest Gator Stories Ever Told, Sports Publishing, LLC, Champaign, Illinois (2002).  .
 McCarthy, Kevin M.,  Fightin' Gators: A History of University of Florida Football, Arcadia Publishing, Mount Pleasant, South Carolina (2000).  .
 Nash, Noel, ed., The Gainesville Sun Presents The Greatest Moments in Florida Gators Football, Sports Publishing, Inc., Champaign, Illinois (1998).  .

1976 births
Living people
American football defensive tackles
Atlanta Falcons players
Florida Gators football players
Jacksonville Jaguars players
People from Mayo, Florida
Players of American football from Florida
San Francisco 49ers players
Washington Redskins players